Herbert I may refer to:

 Herbert I, Count of Vermandois (c. 848/850 – 907)
 Herbert I, Count of Maine (died in 1036)